Mohamed Magdy Elhusseiny Mahmoud (born 23 April 1989) is an Egyptian professional footballer who plays as a midfielder for Burgan SC in Kuwait Federation Cup.

International Club Career

Mohamed Magdy. started his career in the Egyptian Premier League with ENPPI SC on 2005 and was tapped by Muktijoddha Sangsad KC in the Bangladesh Premier League on 2012.This was the start of his international career as Lynx F.C. of Gibraltar National League took him in as their standout on 2015.

After his performance in Europe, leading football agency in Maldives, Transfer Academy, negotiated Magdy to Maldives for Club Eagles to help the team win the championship in 2016 President's Cup (Maldives) in the Dhivehi League. He bagged the "Best Player" of the game.

Magdy is currently playing in one of the newer established sporting clubs in Kuwait, Burgan SC

References

Living people
Egyptian footballers
1991 births
Egyptian Muslims
Association football midfielders
Egyptian expatriate footballers
Burgan SC players
Lynx F.C. players
Muktijoddha Sangsad KC players
ENPPI SC players
El Dakhleya SC players
Club Eagles players
Expatriate footballers in the Maldives
Egyptian expatriate sportspeople in the Maldives
Egyptian expatriate sportspeople in Gibraltar
Egyptian expatriate sportspeople in Bangladesh
Expatriate footballers in Kuwait
Expatriate footballers in Bangladesh
Expatriate footballers in Gibraltar
Egyptian expatriate sportspeople in Kuwait